Marian Ainslee (1896 – 1966) was an American screenwriter and researcher active during Hollywood's silent film era. She often co-wrote titles for silent films with Ruth Cummings.

Biography 
Marian Ainslee was born in Marceline, Missouri. Her first job out of school was as a newspaper reporter in Jefferson City, Missouri, where she interviewed politicians. Discouraged by salaries she encountered in journalism, she decided to move to Hollywood and give screenwriting a try. After getting her start as a script clerk, Ainslee became one of MGM's top title writers during the 1920s and early 1930s, linked closely to producer Irving Thalberg. When Thalberg died, she briefly retired from screenwriting; in 1938, she signed with RKO and wrote Carefree. According to one estimation, she titled as many as 200 films during her time in the business. She was married to Albert Coonley, a newspaper artist; they appear to have been divorced by the time of his death in 1941.

Selected filmography

 The Duke of Chimney Butte (1921)
 Foolish Wives (1922)
 A Lady of Quality (1924)
 He Who Gets Slapped (1924)
 Secrets of the Night (1924)
 The Merry Widow (1925)
 Graustark (1925)
 The Tower of Lies (1925)
 Bardelys the Magnificent (1926)
 The Temptress (1926)
 Flesh and the Devil (1926)
 Winners of the Wilderness (1927)
 Lovers? (1927)
 California (1927)
 Annie Laurie (1927)
 Foreign Devils (1927)
 Quality Street (1927)
 In Old Kentucky (1927)
 Love (1927)
 A Certain Young Woman (1928)
 The Mysterious Lady (1928)
 Our Dancing Daughters (1928)
 The Masks of the Devil (1928)
 Dream of Love (1928)
 A Woman of Affairs (1928)
 Wild Orchids (1929)
 Desert Nights (1929)
 The Bridge of San Luis Rey (1929)
 Wonder of Woman (1929)
 The Single Standard (1929)
 Hallelujah (1929)
 Our Modern Maidens (1929)
 The Kiss (1929)
 Queen Kelly (1932)
 What Every Woman Knows (1934)
 Carefree (1938)

References

External links

American women screenwriters
1896 births
1966 deaths
Screenwriters from Missouri
20th-century American women writers
People from Marceline, Missouri
20th-century American screenwriters